KKDJ may refer to:

 KKDJ-LD, a low-power television station (channel 8) licensed to serve Santa Maria, California, United States
 KBFP-FM, a radio station (105.3 FM) licensed to serve Delano, California, which held the call sign KKDJ from 1998 to 2006
 KMJ-FM, a radio station (105.9 FM) licensed to serve Fresno, California, which held the call sign KKDJ from 1979 to 1996
 KIIS-FM, a radio station (102.7 FM) licensed to serve Los Angeles, California, which held the call sign KKDJ from 1971 to 1975